Samuel Gould may refer to:
 Samuel W. Gould (1852–1935), US Congressman from Maine
 Samuel B. Gould (1910–1997), US educator
 Julius Gould (1924–2019) (full name Samuel Julius Gould), English professor